Atanu Ghosh is an Indian filmmaker. His Bengali film Mayurakshi (2017) was awarded the National Film Award for Best Feature Film in Bengali. His film Angshumaner Chhobi, Mayurakshi, Binisutoy, Abby Sen and Rupkatha Noy, bagged multiple Awards.He was born on 12 August 1969 in Kolkata, West Bengal. One of his Bengali movies named Mayurakshi was awarded as the Best Feature Film in Bengali. Atanu started his career as a scriptwriter and director for documentary films in 1996. For his work in Aar Ek Bampi, he received the Doordarshan National Awards for Best Children's Telefilm.

Biography

Right from his debut feature film, Atanu's films have been widely shown in most prominent film festivals across the world. Winner of numerous national and international awards, his works reflect an urge for exploring unique complexities of human behaviour pitted against the backdrop of rapidly changing society. His films are known for perceptual precision and economy of expression.

After completing post-graduation in journalism from the University of Calcutta, Ghosh started his career in 1996 as scriptwriter and director of documentary films. Thereafter, he branched out to fictional serials and telefilms.

He received the Doordarshan National Award for Best Children's telefilm Aar ek Bampi in 2002. Another telefilm, Akashchhoan, was selected for the 10th International Kolkata Film Festival, 2004. Sumitra Online was selected for the Telesamman Award for the Best Telefilm of 2005, and Asamapto for Best Direction in 2006. Megh Brishti Rodh fetched him the coveted RAPA Award for Best screenplay. He was awarded the prestigious Shyamal Sen Smriti Samman in 2008.

Ghosh wrote a play for National School of Drama, New Delhi entitled "Ruh-ba-Ruh" directed by Kaushik Sen. He has directed some 23 telefilms. Ghosh has also worked as scriptwriter and editor for many eminent directors. Also, he has directed over 30 documentary and corporate films for many reputed organisations. His debut feature film, Angshumaner Chhobi (2009) was selected in the Indian Panorama of the International Film Festival of India (2009) as well as in Competitive Section, was awarded the prestigious Aravindan Puraskaram for the Best debut film of 2009, the Lankesh Chitra Prashasti (Karnataka State Award for India's Best Debut Director ) Bengal Film Journalist Award as well as Audience Award (Rainbow Film Festival, London) besides 13 other national and international awards. Takhan Teish was his second film, which was released in 2011. It was screened at film festivals in Shanghai, Osaka and other places. His third film Rupkatha Noy (2013) was nominated for the FIPRESCI Award for Best Indian Film 2013, was officially selected in many film festivals including Shanghai International Film Festival,

Dhaka International Film Festival and many others. It received four Filmfare Awards including Best Film (Critics Choice), Best Actor (Critics Choice) - Soumitra Chatterjee, Best Debut Actress (Sohini Sarkar), Best Female Playback Singer (Anwesha Dutta Gupta). His fourth film, Ek Phaali Rodh (2014), had its World Premiere at Shanghai International Film Festival in June 2014.

He received a National Film Award in the Best Film category for his 2018 movie Mayurakshi. His sixth film Mayurakshi received four Filmfare Awards including Best Film (Critics Choice), Best Actor (Critics Choice) - (Soumitra Chatterjee), Best Actor (Popular Choice)- (Prosenjit Chatterjee), Best Background Score (Debojyoti Mishra). Mayurakshi was awarded the prestigious Chitra Bharathi for the Best Indian Cinema Award of 2018, the WBFJA (West Bengal Film Journalists' Association) for Best Film, Best Actor (Soumitra Chatterjee), Best Actor (Prosenjit Chatterjee) besides 3 international nominations.

Filmography

Feature films
 Angshumaner Chhobi (2009)
 Takhan Teish (2010)
 Rupkatha Noy (2013)
 Ek Phaali Rodh (2014)
 Abby Sen (2015)
 Mayurakshi (2017)
 Robibaar (2019)
 Binisutoy (2021)
 72 Ghanta (2022)
 Aaro Ek Prithibi (2022)
 Shesh Pata (2022)

Telefilms
The following is the list of telefilms directed by Atanu Ghosh. For all but one of these telefilms, Atanu Ghosh is also credited for the story and screenplay:

Others
Notable films/serials/documentaries:
 Banglar Swadeshi Gaan – a 3-episode series on the patriotic songs of Bengal to commemorate 50 years of Indian independence
 Ebong Computer – a 10 episode fictional series on computers
 Aatanka – a 40 min fictional film on AIDS awareness
 Chalti Hawa – a 10 episode musical series on Bengali Band music
 Goenda Poribar – a 52 episode fiction series
 Icchedana – a 26 episode science fiction series for children
 Ardhek Prithibi – a 26 episode fiction series
 Abaak Prithibi – a 26 episode fiction series

References

Sources
 http://www.thestatesman.net/page.arcview.php?clid=25&id=205716&usrsess=1
 http://www.thestatesman.net/page.arcview.php?clid=25&id=172857&usrsess=1
 
 https://web.archive.org/web/20080119023045/http://www.thestatesman.net/page.news.php?clid=25&theme=&usrsess=1&id=185385
 http://www.taratv.com/telespec.html
 https://web.archive.org/web/20071217030324/http://banglatelefilmclub.org/
 https://web.archive.org/web/20080612100922/http://www.realbollywood.com/news/2007/01/indian-telefilms.html
 
 http://timesofindia.indiatimes.com/calcutta-times/big-screen-brings-added-charm-to-bangla-telefilms/articleshow/791509.cms
 https://web.archive.org/web/20081014060317/http://www.my-westbengal.com/n/a/arc6-2005.shtml

External links 

 
 

Living people
21st-century Indian film directors
Film directors from Kolkata
Bengali film directors
1969 births
University of Calcutta alumni